Kung Fu Mahjong 2 is a 2005 Hong Kong film directed by Wong Jing and starring Cherrie Ying, Yuen Wah and Yuen Qiu. It is the first sequel to Kung Fu Mahjong.

Synopsis
A master Mahjong player named Fanny (Cherrie Ying) gets divorced by her husband and must play in the King of Mahjong match to win him back. As she plays, she must rely on her kung fu skills to beat up the famous cheaters such as the Japanese woman, a Muay Thai boxer, the triplets and much more and win allied with her classmates, master, and brother (called ugly) along with her "Nipple Twister" technique. The film ends with Fanny nippletwisting her ex-husband and winning the match.

Cast
 Cherrie Ying
 Yuen Wah
 Yuen Qiu
 Wong Jing
 Terence Yin
 Wong Tin-lam
 Sammy Leung
 Tiffany Lee
 Matt Chow

Sequel
Kung Fu Mahjong 3 has a young mahjong expert named Ken and his unlucky girlfriend up against an old enemy of Ken's champion father and his mysterious stepmother Sophie. There is a scene where Ken tricks three players into having tiles that match. His goodbye words were (in English translation), "On Uncle Dad's birthday...Don't screw it up...GET THE HELL OUTTA HERE!!"

External links

Hong Kong comedy films
2000s Cantonese-language films
Films about gambling
2005 films
Films directed by Wong Jing
2000s Hong Kong films